Atom Man vs. Superman is a 1950 American film serial and the second Superman movie serial featuring Kirk Alyn, credited (as with the previous serial) only by his character name, Superman.

When Lex Luthor blackmails the city of Metropolis by threatening to destroy the entire community, Perry White, editor of the Daily Planet assigns Lois Lane, Jimmy Olsen and Clark Kent to cover the story. The first chapter was released in July 1950.

Plot
Lex Luthor, the Atom Man, invents a number of deadly devices to plague the city, including a disintegrating machine which can reduce people to their basic atoms and reassemble them in another place. But Superman manages to thwart each scheme. Since Kryptonite can rob Superman of his powers, Luthor decides to create a synthetic Kryptonite and putters about obtaining the necessary ingredients: plutonium, radium and the undefined 'etc.' Luthor places the Kryptonite at the launching of a ship, with Superman in attendance. He is exposed to the Kryptonite and passes out. Superman is taken off in an ambulance driven by Luthor's henchmen, and he is now under the control of Luthor. Superman is placed in a device, a lever is pulled, and the Man of Steel vanishes into "The Empty Doom".

Cast
 Kirk Alyn as Kal-El / Clark Kent / Superman
 Noel Neill as Lois Lane
 Lyle Talbot as Lex Luthor / Atom Man
 Tommy Bond as Jimmy Olsen
 Pierre Watkin as Perry White
 Jack Ingram as Foster
 Don C. Harvey as Albor
 Rusty Wescoatt as Carl
 Terry Frost as Baer
 Wally West as Dorr
 Paul Stader as "Killer" Lawson
 George Robotham as Earl

Production

Lyle Talbot, who had previously starred as Commissioner Jim Gordon in the 1949 Columbia Serial Batman and Robin, here portrays Lex Luthor (and also Luthor's alter-ego "Atom Man"). In his "Atom Man" disguise, Talbot as Luthor, utilizes a vaguely German accent and wears an ominous mask fashioned from a "Metallogen Man" robot costume left over from 1945's The Monster and the Ape. Despite their onscreen personas, Talbot (Lex Luthor), who wore a rubber scalp to create the impression of baldness, and Alyn (Superman) spent much of their time, when not shooting, exchanging recipes; both actors shared an interest in cookery.

Special effects 
The final set piece shows Metropolis under attack by "poorly animated" flying saucers and a torpedo.

The flying effects were somewhat improved in this film than in the original, by the simple expedient of turning the camera on its side. Kirk Alyn stood with arms raised in front of a cyclorama, while a wind machine and smoke pot were placed above him (out of frame). This gave an inexpensive illusion of flight. Longer shots continued to use cartoon animation of the Man of Steel.

Critical appraisal
In their book The Great Movie Serials, Jim Harman and Donald F. Glut describe the serial as "far more gimmicky and gadget prone" than the first Superman serial. In addition to this, they also found it to be "flawed by the same Katzman cheapness".

Home media
In 2006, the Atom Man vs. Superman serial was still available for purchase on VHS videotape, where it was first released back in 1989 as a double tape box set. The serial was also offered available in two separate VHS tapes as Volume 1 (Chapters 1 - 7) and Volume 2 (Chapters 8 - 15). It was officially released on DVD by Warner Home Video, along with its predecessor, 1948's Superman, on November 28, 2006 as Superman - The Theatrical Serials Collection.

With the previous 2006 DVD release out of print for a few years, on October 9, 2018 the serials were re-released as manufactured-on-demand (MOD) DVD from Warner Archive Collection.

Chapter titles
 Superman Flies Again
 Atom Man Appears
 Ablaze In The Sky
 Superman Meets Atom Man
 Atom Man Tricks Superman
 Atom Man's Challenge
 At The Mercy Of Atom Man
 Into The Empty Doom
 Superman Crashes Through
 Atom Man's Heat Ray
 Luthor's Strategy
 Atom Man Strikes
 Atom Man's Flying Saucers
 Rocket Of Vengeance
 Superman Saves The Universe

See also
 List of film serials by year
 List of film serials by studio

References

External links
 
 
 
 Superman.UGO.com

1950 films
Superman films
Live-action films based on DC Comics
American sequel films
Columbia Pictures film serials
American black-and-white films
Films directed by Spencer Gordon Bennet
American science fiction films
1950s science fiction films
1950s superhero films
1950s English-language films
Films with screenplays by George H. Plympton
Films with screenplays by Joseph F. Poland
1950s American films
Films based on DC Comics